Paritosh Painter (born 8 January 1972) is an Indian theatre actor, director, and film, TV writer. He is the writer of several Bollywood movies, some of which are Total Dhamaal (2019), Dhamaal (2007), Paying Guests (2009), and All The Best: Fun Begins (2009)

Education 
Paritosh Painter did his early schooling at St.Joseph's College, Nainital, and then attended Maneckji Cooper School in Mumbai. He graduated from Mithibai College with a bachelor's degree in Science (Chemistry). And then completed his Business Management from NMIMS, Mumbai.

Early career 
Paritosh Painter started his career with a television series CAMPUS on Zee TV and then in 1996 established his own theatre production company Ideas The Entertainment Company under the guidance of Dinyar Contractor.

Career 
Paritosh Painter is the writer of several Bollywood movies, some of which are Dhamaal (2007), Paying Guests (2009), and All The Best: Fun Begins (2009). He did his early education from the prestigious St. Joseph's College, Nainital.

Paritosh joined Reliance Broadcast Network as the Network Creative Director. With this role, Paritosh looks into the creation of differentiated content for the company's television and radio business, including Big Magic and 92.7 Big FM.
He reports to and works closely with Tarun Katial at RBNL.
Paritosh has been the creative mastermind behind some of BIG Magic's most iconic shows like ‘Har Mushkil Ka Hal Akbar Birbal - India's first Historical Comedy. His unique storytelling technique coupled with some of the best-known names on Indian television like Kiku Sharda, Delnaaz Irani, Vishal Kotial, and Keeshwar Merchantt have led the show to become one of the most-watched shows on Indian Television.

He has launched shows like Big Googly with Javed Jaffrey on 92.7 BIG FM and Ali Asgar (actor) on BIG MAGIC. He also launched Narayan Narayan Chulbule Narad ki Natkhat leelayain starring Mantra (actor) on Big Magic.

His latest launches are Total Nadaniyaan on BIG MAGIC - a mad comedy starring Upasna Singh, Gaurav Sharma among others and Indian adaptation of The Middle called Tedi Medi Family. He's also working with Gaurav Gera on developing the famous Shopkeepa Chutki series for the channel.

He was also involved with producing and scripting the Indian television drama series Hongey Judaa Na Hum (2012).

Paritosh Painter is also active in the Indian theater scene, where he is known for writing and producing See No Evil, Hear No Evil, Speak No Evil, Get Rid of My Wife, and I Am The Best.

In 2018, Paritosh created and co-produced comedy web series, Baby Come Naa for Ekta Kapoor's OTT platform ALT Balaji starring Shreyas Talpade, Chunky Pandey, Kiku Sharda, Shefali Zariwala and Manasi Scott.

Paritosh Painter also performs as a stand-up comedian with his show called Women Decoded.

Sports 
Paritosh Painter is the owner of  PUNERI USTAAD - Kabbadi Team, The Winner of the Zee Marathi Khusti Dangal 2018.

Upcoming Films

Films

Television

Theatre

Professional Experience 
 Writer Singapore India Icon Awards 2014
 Writer IIFA Awards - 2013
 Directed & Scripted the ICICI Awards
 Directed & Script the Times Of India – Pink Slip Awards
 Directed & Scripted the Times Of India – Rouge Show
 Directed & Scripted the HSBC – GLT Training Film.

References 

Hindi-language film directors
1972 births
Living people